Carney is Leon Russell's third solo studio album, released in 1972. It peaked at number 2 on the Billboard Hot 200 and was the first for Russell to contain a hit single — "Tight Rope" b/w "This Masquerade" — which reached number 11 on the Billboard Hot 100 chart.

Reception

In a review for Allmusic, the critic Stephen Thomas Erlewine called "Tight Rope", the opening track, "an excellent introduction to an off-kilter, confused, fascinating album" and said that the album "consolidates his two extremes, offering a side of fairly straightforward roots rock before delving headfirst into twisted psychedelia on the second side." Critic Robert Christgau expressed similar sentiments, writing, "Not the radical falloff some report — just slippage, the first side listenable and the second flaky."

Track listing
All tracks composed by Leon Russell except where indicated.

Side One
"Tight Rope" – 2:59
"Out in the Woods" – 3:35
"Me and Baby Jane" – 3:53
"Manhattan Island Serenade" – 3:26
"Cajun Love Song" – 3:08
"Roller Derby" – 2:22

Side Two
"Carney" – :45
"Acid Annapolis" (Leon Russell, Don Preston) – 2:51
"If the Shoe Fits" – 2:23
"My Cricket" – 2:56
"This Masquerade" – 4:22
"Magic Mirror" – 4:54

Charts

Personnel
Leon Russell – vocals, guitar, bass guitar, piano
Don Preston – guitar, vocals
Joey Cooper – guitar
Carl Radle – bass guitar
Chuck Blackwell, Jim Keltner – drums
John Gallie – Hammond organ
Technical
Marlin Greene, John Lemay, Peter Nicholls – engineer
Gene Brownell – art direction
Daniel Mayo – photography

References

Leon Russell albums
1972 albums
A&M Records albums
Albums produced by Denny Cordell
Albums produced by Leon Russell
Albums recorded at Muscle Shoals Sound Studio
Shelter Records albums